Michael John King (born 26 September 1991) is an English former professional footballer who played as a left winger for Burnley in the Football League

Career
King signed apprentice terms with Burnley in May 2008, along with five other players. After appearing for the reserves in the 2009–10 season, he got offered professional terms in May 2010 along with Dominic Knowles, his chief assistant.

He made his debut for the clarets in the Football League Cup game against Morecambe at the Globe Arena on 24 August 2010, which ended in a 3–1 win for Burnley. He came on as a late substitute for Chris Eagles.

King has also made several appearances on the Skill Schools segment of Soccer AM representing Burnley

Club

Personal life 
Following his stint at Geylang United, King went on to study at St Aidan's College, Durham University, going on to play for the University A-Team. He currently lives in Finsbury Park with long-term partner, Gemma Stanley.

References

External links

Claretsmad profile

1991 births
Living people
English footballers
Association football midfielders
Burnley F.C. players
People from Aughton, Lancashire
Expatriate footballers in Singapore
Geylang International FC players
Singapore Premier League players